Bayramlı (also, Bayramly) is a village and municipality in the Barda Rayon of Azerbaijan.  It has a population of 150.

References 

Populated places in Barda District